Robert Hale Merriman (November 17, 1908 – ) was an American doctoral student who fought with the Republican forces in Spain during the Spanish Civil War. He was killed while commanding the Abraham Lincoln Battalion of the International Brigades.

Early years
Merriman was born in  Eureka, California, the son of a lumberjack. He grew up in Santa Cruz, and graduated from Santa Cruz High School in 1925. He worked various odd jobs in order to make his way through the University of Nevada. To earn some extra money at school, he joined the Reserve Officers' Training Corps (ROTC) where he received basic training with arms.

In 1932, he wed Frances Marion Stone, one year his junior. That same year he returned to California as a doctoral student in economics at the University of California, Berkeley and worked as a teaching assistant. Fascinated by Marxism-Leninism and the emerging economics in the Soviet Union, Merriman earned a scholarship to study for one year in Moscow along with his wife. There he became interested in the anti-fascist movement and left before his year was up to move to Spain while his wife stayed in Moscow, where she was working. Like most Americans involved with the Spanish cause, the Merrimans were communists. According to his wife, Merriman was convinced that defeating the fascists in Spain and then Germany would prevent a second World War.

Spain

Combat
A member of left-wing groups at the University of California and friend of Robert Oppenheimer, he was chosen to lead the volunteers in Spain.   As few volunteers had any military experience, Merriman's ROTC experience meant he took over the training of the 428-man Lincoln Battalion and, in late January, he became battalion commander. He held the rank of Captain of the Spanish Republic. 

The Lincoln Battalion first saw action at the Battle of Jarama (6–27 February). They were one of the four battalions comprising the XV International Brigade. Their role was to prevent Nationalist forces taking the main Madrid-Valencia road. The Lincolns took appalling casualties, particularly in the assault of Pingarrón, which became known as Suicide Hill. Merriman himself was seriously wounded and spent time as Chief of XV Brigade Staff. His place as battalion commander was taken by Martin Hourihan (a US Army veteran).

Merriman, who suffered a severe arm injury, was joined by his wife in Spain, where she nursed him back to health and also joined the International Brigades at their training camp in Albacete.

The depleted Lincolns next went into action at the Battle of Brunete. Together with the depleted British Battalion and an understrength second US battalion (the George Washington Battalion, commanded by African American Oliver Law), they formed one regiment of the XV International Brigade. Of the 2,500 men of the XV who went into battle, only 1,000 effective soldiers remained.

Death
Merriman led the Lincoln-Washington Battalion again during the Battle of Teruel during the Aragon Offensive in March 1938. Under heavy attack by Nationalist tanks and aircraft, the Americans had been badly mauled at the Battle of Belchite. The battalion was forced to retreat towards Catalonia and its boundary river, the Ebro, because it was the only direction available.

On April 2, the Lincoln-Washington Battalion made camp in the vineyards near Corbera d'Ebre. However, the Americans were unaware that the town had been captured by the Nationalists at noon on April 2. As the troops passed through the town, Merriman, and his second-in-command, David Doran, as well as several other American officers from the Lincoln and Washington Battalions of the International Brigades, including Lieutenant Edgar James Cody, were captured. One anonymous account states they were executed.

For some time, Merriman's family was led to believe he was safe because of conflicting reports about his whereabouts. His wife had already returned to the United States in January 1938. She had originally planned to return to Spain, but never heard from him after March. On April 13, there was news that he had "miraculously escaped death or capture". She eventually came to believe he died in the retreat.

His widow later remarried and had three children. She worked at Stanford University and in 1986 published her memoir, American Commander in Spain.

Legacy
Milton Wolff replaced Merriman as battalion commander and returned to the same ground a few months after Merriman's death during the Battle of the Ebro on 26 July while trying to recapture Gandesa.

The 6'4" Merriman is believed to have been the inspiration for Robert Jordan in Ernest Hemingway's For Whom the Bell Tolls. Merriman and Hemingway briefly met in Madrid, and Hemingway was "deeply impressed" with the young idealist.

References

Sources

 Eric Blaine Coleman, Some Men Put In Their Lives: Americans in the International Brigades, Spain 1936-1939, (2001)
 Antony Beevor, Battle for Spain: The Spanish Civil War 1936-1939 (2006) 
 Hugh Thomas, The Spanish Civil War. (Revised edition 2003)

External links
 Merriman in Spain
 The Lincoln Brigade in Spain
 New York Times review of book about Merriman
 Merriman in the Spanish Civil War (Spanish)
 The photo archives of the American Volunteers in Spain - ALBA

1908 births
1938 deaths
University of California, Berkeley faculty
University of California, Berkeley alumni
University of Nevada alumni
People from Santa Cruz, California
People from Eureka, California
Abraham Lincoln Brigade members
Military personnel killed in the Spanish Civil War
American communists